Jeogla is a locality in the Armidale Regional Council region of New South Wales, Australia. It contains much of Cunnawarra National Park and the Georges Creek Nature Reserve.

A postal receiving office opened at Jeogla on 17 May 1920, and was upgraded to a post office on 9 December that year. It closed on 24 September 1981.

Jeogla School operated from 1890 to 1891, 1893 to 1902, 1908 to 1915 (half-time with Chandler from 1908 to 1909) and from 1918 until its final closure in 1968.

Heritage listings
Jeogla has a number of heritage-listed sites, including:
 Oxley Wild Rivers National Park: Kunderang East Pastoral Station

References

 
Localities in New South Wales
Armidale Regional Council